Prophaethon is an extinct genus of seabird that lived during the Early Eocene (Ypresian, c.56-49 mya). It is essentially known from fairly comprehensive remains of a single individual, namely skull and some limb bones, which were recovered from the London Clay on the Isle of Sheppey, England. Some more indeterminable remains from the Late Paleocene of Maryland, US might also belong here. Thus, the genus contains only a single species, Prophaethon shrubsolei. As indicated by its name, it is a distant relative of the tropicbirds.

References

Eocene birds
Bird genera
Prophaethontidae
Extinct birds of Europe